Center Township is a township in Decatur County, Iowa, USA.  As of the 2000 census, its population was 317.

Geography
Center Township covers an area of 33.11 square miles (85.74 square kilometers); of this, 0.42 square miles (1.08 square kilometers) or 1.26 percent is water. The stream of West Little River runs through this township.

Adjacent townships
 Franklin Township (north)
 Garden Grove Township (northeast)
 High Point Township (east)
 Woodland Township (southeast)
 Eden Township (south)
 Burrell Township (southwest)
 Leon Township (southwest)
 Decatur Township (west)
 Long Creek Township (northwest)

Cemeteries
The township contains one cemetery, Franklin.

Major highways
 U.S. Route 69

Airports and landing strips
 Decatur County Hospital Heliport
 McMillian Field

References
 U.S. Board on Geographic Names (GNIS)
 United States Census Bureau cartographic boundary files

External links
 US-Counties.com
 City-Data.com

Townships in Decatur County, Iowa
Townships in Iowa